Central retinal vein occlusion, also CRVO, is when the central retinal vein becomes occluded, usually through thrombosis. The central retinal vein is the venous equivalent of the central retinal artery and both may become occluded. Since the central retinal artery and vein are the sole source of blood supply and drainage for the retina, such occlusion can lead to severe damage to the retina and blindness, due to ischemia (restriction in blood supply) and edema (swelling).

CRVO can cause ocular ischemic syndrome. Nonischemic CRVO is the milder form of the disease. It may progress to the more severe ischemic type. CRVO can also cause glaucoma.

Diagnosis
Despite the role of thrombosis in the development of CRVO, a systematic review found no increased prevalence of thrombophilia (an inherent propensity to thrombosis) in patients with retinal vascular occlusion.

Treatment
Treatment consists of Anti-VEGF drugs like Lucentis or intravitreal steroid implant (Ozurdex) and Pan-Retinal Laser Photocoagulation usually. Underlying conditions also require treatment. CRVO without ischemia has better visual prognosis than ischemic CRVO.

A systematic review studied the effectiveness of the anti-VEGF drugs ranibizumab and pagatanib sodium for patients with non-ischemic CRVO. Though there was a limited sample size, participants in both treatment groups showed improved visual acuity over 6 month periods, with no safety concerns.

See also
 Central retinal artery occlusion
 Branch retinal artery occlusion
 Branch retinal vein occlusion

Eylea
Iridodialysis
Ischemic optic neuropathy

References

External links 

Disorders of choroid and retina